The list of ship commissionings in 1946 includes a chronological list of all ships decommissioned in 1946.


See also 

1946
 Ship commissionings